Farmers Security Bank, also known as the First Bank Building, is a historic bank building located at South Bend, St. Joseph County, Indiana. It was built in 1915, and is a six-story, Commercial style dark brown brick building with terra cotta trim. It has a two-story rectangular plan, which forms an "H" on the four upper stories.

It was listed on the National Register of Historic Places in 1985.  It is located in the West Washington Historic District.

References

Commercial buildings on the National Register of Historic Places in Indiana
Commercial buildings completed in 1915
Buildings and structures in South Bend, Indiana
National Register of Historic Places in St. Joseph County, Indiana
Historic district contributing properties in Indiana
Chicago school architecture in Indiana